("flying boules"), or  ("Lyonnais boules"), is a boules-type game.

In , the balls are thrown overhand (palm down) and are metal. In standard , the wooden or plastic balls are tossed underhand (palm up) and rolled.

, as it is called for short by the Italians, derives its name from the Italian verb  meaning 'to fly', and refers to the technique of throwing a ball through the air in an attempt to knock away an opponent's ball. 

It is similar to traditional  (and different from ) in that the ball is delivered with a run-up.

See also
Fédération Internationale de Boules

References

External links
 BocceVolo.com - World Class Bocce

Boules
Throwing sports
Sports originating in Italy